Phebellia is a genus of flies in the family Tachinidae.

Species
Phebellia agnatella Mesnil, 1955
Phebellia aurifrons Chao & Chen, 2007
Phebellia carceliaeformis (Villeneuve, 1937)
Phebellia cerurae (Sellers, 1943)
Phebellia clavellariae (Brauer & von Bergenstamm, 1891)
Phebellia curriei (Coquillett, 1897)
Phebellia epicydes (Walker, 1849)
Phebellia erecta (Sellers, 1943)
Phebellia flavescens Shima, 1981
Phebellia fulvipollinis Chao & Chen, 2007
Phebellia glauca (Meigen, 1824)
Phebellia glaucoides Herting, 1961
Phebellia glirina (Rondani, 1859)
Phebellia helvina (Coquillett, 1897)
Phebellia imitator (Sellers, 1943)
Phebellia laxifrons Shima, 1981
Phebellia margaretae Bergstrӧm, 2005
Phebellia nigricauda Mesnil, 1963
Phebellia nudicosta Shima, 1981
Phebellia pauciseta (Villeneuve, 1908)
Phebellia pheosiae (Sellers, 1943)
Phebellia setocoxa Chao & Chen, 2007
Phebellia trichiosomae (Sellers, 1943)
Phebellia triseta (Pandellé, 1896)
Phebellia turanica Mesnil, 1963
Phebellia vicina (Wainwright, 1940)
Phebellia villica (Zetterstedt, 1838)

References

Diptera of North America
Diptera of Europe
Diptera of Asia
Exoristinae
Tachinidae genera
Taxa named by Jean-Baptiste Robineau-Desvoidy